Arthur Tunstal Redmayne (25 April 1857 – 27 December 1933) was an English-born New Zealand cricketer who played for Canterbury. He was born in Hendon, Middlesex and died in Ambleside, Westmorland.

Redmayne made a single first-class appearance for the team, during the 1880–81 season, against Otago. In the only innings in which he batted, he scored 61 runs.

References

External links
Arthur Redmayne at Cricket Archive 

1857 births
1933 deaths
New Zealand cricketers
Canterbury cricketers
People from Hendon